Milton Keynes South is a constituency represented in the House of Commons of the UK Parliament since its 2010 creation by Iain Stewart, a Conservative.

History
This constituency (and its counterpart, Milton Keynes North), came into being when the two Milton Keynes constituencies (Milton Keynes North East and Milton Keynes South West) were reconfigured following the Boundary Commission's Fifth Periodic Review of Westminster constituencies with the aim of equalising the electorate as between the constituencies in the light of population growth that had occurred mainly in the Milton Keynes Urban Area. This constituency is the more urban of the two.

Iain Stewart MP won the new constituency for the Conservatives in the 2010 general election. This new constituency is a very large part of the former Milton Keynes South West, which had been held by Phyllis Starkey for Labour for 13 years until the 2010 general election.

In the 2015 general election, Iain Stewart again won the Milton Keynes South constituency for the Conservative Party.

Constituency profile
The constituency takes up the smaller part but more dense part of the City of Milton Keynes and is one of the borough's two constituencies. Milton Keynes South is primarily an urban area with some rural elements; the other, Milton Keynes North, covers a larger area and is more rural.

Boundaries

The seat comprises the City of Milton Keynes wards of:
 Bletchley East
 Bletchley Park
 Bletchley West
 Bradwell
 Broughton
 Campbell Park and Old Woughton
 Danesborough and Walton
 Loughton and Shenley
 Monkston
 Shenley Brook End
 Stony Stratford
 Tattenhoe
 Woughton and Fishermead

Members of Parliament

Elections

Elections in the 2010s

See also
 Milton Keynes North
 List of parliamentary constituencies in Buckinghamshire

Notes

References

Parliamentary constituencies in Buckinghamshire
Constituencies of the Parliament of the United Kingdom established in 2010
Politics of Milton Keynes